Sardow may refer to:
 Sardow-ye Olya
 Sardow-ye Sofla